Chris Evert was the defending champion but had clashing commitments in World TeamTennis.
Eleventh-seed Kathy May won the title and $6,000 first-prize money, defeating Brigitte Cuypers in the final.

Seeds
A champion seed is indicated in bold text while text in italics indicates the round in which that seed was eliminated.

Draw

Finals

Top half

Section 1

Section 2

Bottom half

Section 3

Section 4

References

U.S. Clay Court Championships
1976 U.S. Clay Court Championships